Balázs Kiss (born 5 August 1999) is a Hungarian artistic gymnast.

Career 
Balázs Kiss won a bronze in the senior team event at the 2020 European Men's Artistic Gymnastics Championships.

References

Living people
1999 births
Hungarian male artistic gymnasts
Gymnasts from Budapest
21st-century Hungarian people